Cluetivity is a geolocation-based and augmented reality (AR) software platform owned by Life Action Games GmbH. Founded in 2010 by a group of scavenger hunt and tech fans, Cluetivity offers both outdoor and indoor interactive games for iOS devices. The company is currently led by CEO, Michael Schiemann.

Adopting location-based technology, Cluetivity's games use mobile device GPS to follow a treasure hunt inspired storyline. Often equipped with an ‘ActionPack’ – an optional extension consisting of a briefcase containing physical items to be used throughout the game - users must follow the on-screen instructions and story to explore their local area, and find clues, source objects, and crack riddles presented by the game. Some titles might also require players to engage in activities such as taking a group photo or using specific items in the ActionPack to complete a task. Using geolocation services, the game's storyline also adapts itself to match real-world landmarks in the user's surrounding area.

Cluetivity utilises a license-based business model, where companies purchase a license from Cluetivity to offer pay-per-play games to their customers. These companies are referred to as Cluetivity's partners. This license also guarantees partners city-wide exclusivity to Cluetivity games they purchase.

The platform launched in 2010. Cluetivity released their first geocaching-based game, The Magic Portal, in 2016. As of October 2019, Cluetivity's games are available in over 170 locations worldwide.

Gameplay 
Cluetivity's games can separated into 2 categories — indoor AR games and outdoor AR games. Whilst each game allows for 2-6 players per team, the platform has functionality for 2000 players to play at the same time.

Using the iOS app, each player inputs their names into the game and follow the storyline presented on screen. Initially establishing their location using mobile network data, players must explore their local area, aided by GPS, to find clues to solve riddles and tasks each game presents.

For every task each team completes, the team receive EXP points which can be used in exchange for hints, which help players out in difficult situations.

As of 2019, Cluetivity offers 3 different titles: ‘The Magic Portal’, ‘Operation Mindfall’, and ‘Einstein Unsolved’.

The Magic Portal 
Cluetivity's first release — The Magic Portal — premiered in January 2016. Available only on iOS, The Magic Portal is an outdoor AR game that follows the story of an open magic portal, whereby players must solve riddles and collect crystals to ensure it is shut. With an average playing time of 1 hour, The Magic Portal is a game aimed at families/young children.

Since its release in 2016, The Magic Portal has remained a staple in Cluetivity's catalogue.

Operation Mindfall 
After the success of The Magic Portal, Cluetivity's second game — Operation Mindfall — was released in August 2017. Marking their first game outside of the fantasy genre, Operation Mindfall follows the story of an evil organisation, hell-bent on causing a worldwide catastrophe. The players are quickly informed that they are now secret agents who must solve riddles using cryptic clues, to defeat the evil organisation.

In June 2018, Cluetivity released an ExtensionSet for the game in the form of a Code Scanner.

Einstein Unsolved 
Cluetivity's first indoor platform, Einstein Unsolved, was released in June 2018. Similar to previous games, Einstein Unsolved is available on iOS platforms.
In teams of 2–6, players are presented with an unsolved detective case — the murder of Albert Einstein in 1955. Players must try and identify what the circumstances surrounding his death were and are presented with one chance to correctly solve the case.

See also 

 Augmented reality
 Escape room
 Location-based game
 Munzee
 Geocaching
 Wherigo
 LARP
 Escape Games
 Pokémon Go
 Puzzlehunt

External links 

 Official website
 Facebook Page
 LinkedIn Page

References 

Augmented reality
Companies based in Berlin
Mixed reality games
Mobile game companies
Information technology companies of Germany